The Italianate/neo-Renaissance style  Consumers' Gas Building at 19 Toronto Street in Toronto, Ontario, Canada was first built in 1852, as the Consumers Gas company's head office. The company remained in this location for 125 years.  The 19 Toronto Street façade, designed by David B. Dick, was added to the north in 1876, and the unified façade treating the two structures as one was built by Dick, 1899.  The last renovations were completed in 1983 by Stone & Kohn architects for new owners, Counsel Trust Company.

The building currently houses Don Alfonso 1890 Italian Restaurant; and Rosewater Room the award-winning event venue by Liberty Entertainment Group.

References

External links
 Consumers' Gas Building

Buildings and structures in Toronto
Italianate architecture in Canada
Commercial buildings completed in 1852
1852 establishments in Canada